The 30th Stockholm International Film Festival took place on 6–17 November 2019 in Stockholm, Sweden.

Peruvian drama film Song Without a Name won the Bronze Horse, most prestigious award. Noah Baumbach's Marriage Story served as the opening film for the 30th edition. Jojo Rabbit closed the festival.

Official selections

Competition

American Independents

Discovery

Documania

Documentary Competition

Icons

Impact

Open Zone

Awards
The following awards were presented during the 30th edition:
Best Film (Bronze Horse): Song Without a Name by Melina León
Best Director: Mark Jenkin for Bait
Best First Film: You Deserve a Lover by Hafsia Herzi
Best Script: Synonyms by Nadav Lapid and Haim Lapid
Best Actress: Nina Hoss for The Audition
Best Actor: Bartosz Bielenia for Corpus Christi
Best Cinematography: Inti Briones for Song Without a Name
Best Documentary: One Child Nation by Nanfu Wang and Jialing Zhang
Best Short Film: Kingdom Come by Sean Robert Dunn
FIPRESCI Award: By the Grace of God by François Ozon
Rising Star: Celie Sparre
Impact Award: Kantemir Balagov for Beanpole

Lifetime Achievement Award
Max von Sydow

Achievement Award
Payman Maadi

Visionary Award
Céline Sciamma

References

External links
Official website

2019 film festivals
2019 in Swedish cinema
2010s in Stockholm
2019